This is a list of settlements in Rutland by population based on the results of the 2011 census. The next United Kingdom census will take place in 2021. In 2011, there were 24 built-up area subdivisions with 250 or more inhabitants in Rutland, shown in the table below.

List of settlements 

Notes:
The Office of National Statistics (ONS) subdivide built-up areas into sectors which do not respect administrative or political boundaries. If those areas have a strong city/town/village identity, for population purposes they are classed into a distinct area.

See also 

 List of places in Rutland
 List of civil parishes in Rutland

References

External links 
 Link to ONS built up area statistics

East Midlands
NUTS 2 statistical regions of the European Union
 
Settlements
Rutland